The 20 km long Clyde Waterfront is a section of the River Clyde in Scotland that runs from Glasgow Green in the city's center to Dumbarton on the Firth of Clyde. This is one of Britain's largest urban redevelopment initiatives, with over 200 projects on both banks of the Clyde. [1] 

Projects are underway all across the Clyde Waterfront neighborhood to change local commerce, housing, tourism, and infrastructure. The planned public and private investment in Clyde Waterfront as of 2008 was pegged at £5–6 billion. [2] 

The Clyde Waterfront Regeneration project is an ongoing initiative aimed at transforming the waterfront area of Glasgow, Scotland. The project was launched in 2003 and is a long-term effort that involves a range of developments and improvements.

Some of the key aspects of the Clyde Waterfront Regeneration project include:

 New commercial and residential properties: The project has involved the construction of new buildings, including office spaces, residential properties, and hotels. Some notable developments include the Riverside Museum, the Hydro arena, and the Glasgow Science Centre Tower.
 Public spaces: The project aims to create more public spaces along the waterfront, including parks, walkways, and cycle paths. The Glasgow Harbour development includes a riverside promenade, while the Pacific Quay area features a public plaza and landscaped areas.
 Infrastructure improvements: The project has also involved significant infrastructure improvements, including the upgrading of roads, bridges, and public transport links. The Clyde Arc, also known as the Squinty Bridge, was built as part of the project and provides a new pedestrian and cycle route across the river.

The Clyde Waterfront Regeneration project is a collaboration between Glasgow City Council, Scottish Enterprise, and other partners. It is seen as a key driver of economic growth in the area and has already attracted significant investment from both public and private sectors.

As well as supporting inward investment and tourism, the aim of the regeneration of the Clyde is to benefit local communities. It is intended that local people will benefit from the improvements to transport and leisure facilities, shops and businesses, and from new jobs coming into the area.  An estimated 50,000 new jobs will be created as businesses relocate in the area and more housing is built. Re-training is vital and a range of support is available locally to make sure residents can exploit the new opportunities as they arise.

Projects

Commercial and residential

In Glasgow city centre, the International Financial Services District (IFSD) has been set up to attract new financial companies to the city. The IFSD, a joint partnership led by Scottish Enterprise and Glasgow City Council, has created almost two million square feet of new Grade ‘A’ office accommodation in the centre of the city. Since the launch of the project in 2001, over 15,000 new jobs have moved into the area, and over £1 billion has been invested.

Braehead, on the south side of the river at Renfrew, includes a large shopping centre and new businesses continue to move into the area. Business parks are growing, the town of Renfrew is being regenerated, and a number of leading house builders are creating 2,000 new homes at Ferry Village, close to the Xscape leisure development.

Glasgow's Digital Media Quarter at Pacific Quay is now home to the headquarters of BBC Scotland, with three major studio spaces, including "Studio A", the largest television studio outside London. The nearby Medius and Hub buildings, provide further opportunities for Scotland's digital media industries.

Back on the north side of the river, the first phase of the £1.2 billion residential development at Glasgow Harbour is almost entirely sold out. The second phase of housing, GH20, will provide a further 800 apartments, with many already sold and occupied.

Down the river at Clydebank, students at Clydebank College started the 2007/08 academic year in brand new purpose-built accommodation overlooking the river. Forty years ago the John Brown Shipyards were the site for the construction of the QE2. Now the area at Queens Quay has been transformed into a college campus, with adjacent business park accommodation.

Transport
Major transport infrastructure is essential to ensure that the whole area is properly connected, and a number of vital projects are underway. For example, the Clyde Arc, also known as the "Squinty Bridge", was opened, the first road bridge to be built across the Clyde in Glasgow for almost 40 years. The bridge provides an important link between the West End of Glasgow and the Digital Media Quarter at Pacific Quay, and on into Govan.

A pedestrian bridge known as the Tradeston Bridge, was opened in 2009 to link Glasgow's IFSD on the north bank with the emerging developments of the south bank at Tradeston.

Renfrewshire Council are proposing a new road bridge to be built between Renfrew and Yoker. The site of the bridge would be at Renfrew Ferry. If built, the structure would more than likely replace the ferry service. As the Clyde is still an important area for shipping and is still used for ship building, a moveable bridge structure would have to be built to let vessels pass up and down the river. Initial estimates for construction are £50m. If given the go-ahead, construction would start in 2018-19.

Culture and leisure
With the announcement that the Commonwealth Games will be held in Glasgow in 2014, further developments are underway. A proposed stadium, Scotland's National Arena, will be a 12,500-seat arena at SECC. It will sustain 1,400 jobs and continue to attract visitors to the city long after the Games are over. Further hotel accommodation is also required to handle the growth in tourism that is anticipated for the city and there is a commitment to complete key transport infrastructure projects in the area in time for the Games.

Work was completed on the Riverside Museum project in 2011. Architect Zaha Hadid has designed a landmark building which will house Glasgow's transport collection.

Other Clyde Waterfront Regeneration projects

References

External links
 Clyde Waterfront website
 Clyde Waterfront Heritage website
 Scottish National Arena, SECC website
 2014 Commonwealth Games Venues

Glasgow
Redeveloped ports and waterfronts in Scotland
Glasgow Green
River Clyde
Partick
Govan